Khurshed Beknazarov (born 14 June 1992) is a Tajikistani professional football player who currently plays as a defender for Bangladeshi club Rahmatganj MFS and the Tajikistan national team.

Career

Club
On 16 February 2020, FK Khujand announced the return of Beknazarov.

International
Beknazarov made his senior team debut on 2 October 2018 against Nepal.

Career statistics

International

References

External links
 
 Khurshed Beknazarov on Instagram 

1994 births
Living people
Tajikistani footballers
Tajikistani expatriate footballers
Expatriate footballers in Indonesia
Tajikistani expatriate sportspeople in Indonesia
Tajikistan international footballers
Association football defenders
Footballers at the 2014 Asian Games
Asian Games competitors for Tajikistan